Bățani is a commune in Covasna County, Transylvania, Romania. It lies in the Székely Land, an ethno-cultural region in eastern Transylvania.

The commune, with its center at Bățanii Mari, is composed of five villages:
Aita Seacă (Szárazajta), Bățanii Mari (Nagybacon), Bățanii Mici (Kisbacon), Herculian (Magyarhermány), and Ozunca-Băi (Uzonkafürdő).

Geography
The commune is located in the northwestern part of Covasna County,  from the county seat, Sfântu Gheorghe, on the border with Harghita County. It lies at the foot of the Baraolt Mountains, on the banks of the Baraolt, Ozunca, and Aita rivers.

Demographics
During the 2002 census, Bățani had a population of 4,501, of which 3,962 of its inhabitants, or 88.02%, were ethnic Hungarians. According to the 2011 census, the commune has a population of 4,403, of which 83.08% are ethnic Hungarians, 12.24% are Roma people and 1.41% Romanians. For 3.27% of the population, the ethnicity is unknown.

From a confessional point of view, most of the inhabitants are Reformed (75.15%), but there are also minorities of Pentecostals (11.83%), Roman Catholics (4.61%) and Orthodox (2.09%). For 3.5% of the population, the confessional affiliation is not known.

History

The locality formed part of the Székely Land region of the historical Transylvania province. Until the end of World War I, it belonged to the Háromszék County of the Kingdom of Hungary. After the Hungarian–Romanian War of 1919, it passed under Romanian administration, and after the Treaty of Trianon of 1920, it became part of the Kingdom of Romania. From 1925, Bățani belonged to plasa Baraolt, in Trei Scaune County, and from 1938, to Ținutul Argeș.

After the Second Vienna Award in 1940 the commune with all of Northern Transylvania came under Hungarian control for four years. During World War II, ethnic conflicts took place in this area. After the Royal coup d'état of August 1944, Romania switched sides to the Allies; soon after, Romanian Vânători de munte troops entered Covasna County, but were stopped by the defending Hungarian and German Armies. On 4 September 1944, around 40 retreating Romanian soldiers were captured in Szárazajta (Aita Seacă) by the locals, and were tortured and killed. On 26 September 1944, members of the irregular paramilitary Maniu Guard led by Gavril Olteanu massacred thirteen Székelys in Aita Seacă village in a revenge attack.

Following the administrative reforms implemented by the communist regime in 1950, the commune became part of the Stalin Region, and from 1952, part of the Magyar Autonomous Region, while in 1968 it became part of Covasna County.

Natives
Elek Benedek (1859–1929), journalist and writer

References

Communes in Covasna County
Localities in Transylvania
Székely communities